Sir Henry Savile, 1st Baronet (1579 – 23 June 1632) was an English politician.

Life
The eldest son of Sir John Savile, he matriculated at Merton College, Oxford, on 4 February 1584, but left without a degree, entering the Middle Temple in 1593. He was knighted at the coronation of James I, on 23 July 1603, and created a baronet on 29 June 1611.

Savile represented Aldborough in parliament from 1604 to 1611, and again in 1614. Before 1627 he became vice-president of the Council of the North, serving under Thomas Wentworth. In 1629 he was knight of the shire for Yorkshire. He died on 23 June 1632.

Family
Savile married Mary, daughter of John Dent, citizen of London, by whom he had three sons, all of whom predeceased him without issue. The baronetcy therefore expired on his death. His widow married Sir William Sheffield.

Notes

Attribution

1579 births
1632 deaths
Members of the Parliament of England for constituencies in Yorkshire
English MPs 1604–1611
English MPs 1614
English MPs 1628–1629
Members of the Middle Temple
Baronets in the Baronetage of England
Alumni of Merton College, Oxford